The Cocle del Sur River is a river in the Coclé Province of Panama.

The river rises near Llano Grande and runs south, past La Pintada and Santa Maria before joining the Rio Zarati.

See also
List of rivers of Panama

References
 Rand McNally, The New International Atlas, 1993.
CIA map, 1995.

Rivers of Panama